Hindustan Aeronautics Limited Sporting Club (often abbreviated as HAL or HASC) was an institutional Indian football club based in Bangalore. It was named after the company Hindustan Aeronautics Limited (HAL). The club competed in the top tier of Karnataka football — the Bangalore A Division and from 2001, the Bangalore Super Division. One of the top clubs from Karnataka, they have also competed in the National Football League till 2007, and subsequently the I-League, then top tier of Indian football league system.

The club was originally founded in 1950s, with having hockey, football and other sections. They were revived in 2006. Nicknamed "the pilots", HAL used Bangalore Football Stadium as their home ground. In 2014, following poor performance in 2013–14 season, the club announced of "temporary shutting down... activities".

History

Formation and journey
Originally founded in the 1950s, the club later became affiliated with Bangalore District Football Association (BDFA) in the 90s. In 1952, the club clinched prestigious Stafford Challenge Cup title. Hindustan Aeronautics Limited Sports Club began their journey through participating in the Bangalore A Division league, in which they emerged champions in 2000. Before getting revived in 2006, they clinched the Bangalore Super Division titles in 2001, 2002, 2004 and 2005.

2006–2010

After finishing third in the NFL Second Division in 2006, HASC were promoted to the Premier Division. Although only the top two teams from the Second Division gain promotion, Tata Football Academy who finished first in the standings were not able to form a professional team for the Premier Division. Therefore, HASC were promoted to the 11th NFL Premier Division along with runners up Churchill Brothers.

In 2010, the club emerged as the runners-up of the 2010 I-League 2nd Division after the end of final round, hosted in Bengaluru. With 16 points in 7 matches, HAL finished on 2nd as ONGC FC clinched title.

2010–2014

HASC qualified for 2010–11 I-League season after finishing second in the 2010 I-League 2nd Division. They were the second South Indian team in I-League after Viva Kerala. In the last match of the season they defeated defending champions Dempo 4–2 to starve off relegation to I-League 2nd Division, with Xavier Vijay Kumar scoring two goals. HAL later clinched the 2012–13 Bengaluru Super Division title.

In the 2013–14 edition of the Bangalore Super Division, HASC finished eighth among nine teams. This prompted the club to shut down their activities "temporarily" in December 2014. The coach H. Chnadrashekhar said, "We will not field a team temporarily (in the Cups and the league) and to that effect HASC's management had sent a letter to BDFA secretary ST Bhoopal." Reports of the club resuming operations and fielding their team emerged after they held selection trials in 2019.

Crest
The HASC crest was different from the crest its parent company. For instance the Hindustan Company logo has a picture of the earth with a plane going around and has the word HAL written as well as the Hindi way of writing HAL while the HASC just has a crest with the word HAL in green letters.

Home ground

HASC used the Bangalore Football Stadium as its home ground for domestic and regional league matches since 2006, which previously had a capacity of 45,000 spectators. Built in 1967, the stadium has Artificial turf and currently has a capacity of 8,400.

Ownership and finances
The ownership of HASC has been from Hindustan Aeronautics Limited (HAL). The company HAL were not so influential when running the club at first, as shown from their poor record before the 2010 I-League 2nd Division season in which the club achieved promotion.

Notable players
For all current and former notable players of Hindustan Aeronautics Limited with a Wikipedia article, see: Hindustan Aeronautics Limited S.C. players.

Honours

League
National Football League II
Champions (1): 2000–01
Third place (1): 2005–06
 I-League 2nd Division
Runners-up (1): 2010
 Bangalore Super Division
Champions (7): 2001, 2002, 2004, 2005–06, 2007–08, 2008–09, 2012–13
Runners-up (1): 2011–12
 Bangalore B Division
Champions (1): 2020–21

Cup
 Stafford Challenge Cup
Champions (1): 1952
 Sait Nagjee Football Tournament
Champions (3): 1952, 1953, 1954
Puttiah Memorial Trophy
Champions (6): 1977, 2001, 2002, 2003, 2004, 2008

Other department

Field hockey
The club has its hockey team, that competed in Beighton Cup (one of the oldest field hockey tournaments in the world). Then known as Hindustan Aircraft, they lifted the trophy in 1951, and finished as runners-up in 1952.

Honours
Beighton Cup
Champions (1): 1951
Runners-up (1): 1952
Aga Khan Gold Cup
Runners-up (1): 1949

See also

 List of football clubs in India

References

Further reading

External links
 Hindustan Aeronautics Limited SC at WorldFootball.net
Hindustan Aeronautics Limited SC at Soccerway
 Hindustan Aeronautics Limited SC at Global Sports Archive

 
I-League clubs
I-League 2nd Division clubs
Football clubs in Bangalore
Works association football clubs in India
2006 establishments in Karnataka
Association football clubs established in 2006
Association football clubs established in the 1940s